Hemiscyllium michaeli, the leopard epaulette shark, is a species of bamboo shark in the genus Hemiscyllium. It is a tropical shark known from the shallow ocean in the Milne Bay region of eastern Papua New Guinea. The epaulette sharks of this region have long been confused with H. freycineti, and it was only in 2010 that H. michaeli was described as a separate species by Gerald R. Allen and Christine L. Dudgeon.

Etymology
The shark was named in honor of photographer and aquarist Scott W. Michael, who first brought the difference between this species and H. freycineti to the authors’ attention, and for his contributions of information and photographs to Allen’s research on Indo-Pacific fishes.

References

leopard epaulette shark
Fish of Papua New Guinea
Taxa named by Gerald R. Allen
Taxa named by Christine L. Dudgeon
leopard epaulette shark